Mount Benkert is the easternmost member of the Snow Nunataks, standing 8 nautical miles (15 km) east-southeast of Mount Thornton on the coast of Palmer Land. Discovered and photographed by the United States Antarctic Service (USAS), 1939–41. Named by Advisory Committee on Antarctic Names (US-ACAN) for Captain W.M. Benkert, USCG, commander of the Eastwind in Antarctica during Operation Deep Freeze 1966 and 1967.

Mountains of Palmer Land